Gölbaşı (literally "head of the lake") is a Turkish place name that may refer to these places:

 Gölbaşı, Adıyaman, town and district of Adıyaman Province in Turkey
 Gölbaşı, Ankara, town and district of Ankara Province in Turkey
 Gölbaşı, Dicle
 Gölbaşı, Kale
 Gölbaşı, Kestel
 Gölbaşı, Seyhan, a village in the district of Seyhan, Adana Province, Turkey
 Gölbaşı, Yeniçağa
 Gölbaşı Lake, Adıyaman, in Gölbaşı, Adıyaman
 Gölbaşı, alternative name of Lake Mogan in Gölbaşı, Ankara